Teyloides is a genus of spiders in the family Anamidae. It was first described in 1985 by Main. , it contains only one Australian species, Teyloides bakeri.

References

Anamidae
Monotypic Mygalomorphae genera
Spiders of Australia